
Gmina Myślenice is an urban-rural gmina (administrative district) in Myślenice County, Lesser Poland Voivodeship, in southern Poland.

Villages
Apart from the town of Myślenice, Gmina Myślenice contains the villages and settlements of Bęczarka, Borzęta, Bulina, Bysina, Droginia, Głogoczów, Jasienica, Jawornik, Krzyszkowice, Łęki, Osieczany, Polanka, Poręba, Trzemeśnia, Zasań and Zawada.

Neighbouring gminas
Gmina Myślenice is bordered by the gminas of Dobczyce, Mogilany, Pcim, Siepraw, Skawina, Sułkowice and Wiśniowa.

References
Polish official population figures 2006

Myslenice
Myślenice County